Wilson Gonzalez Ochsenknecht (born 18 March 1990) is a German actor. He has appeared in more than twenty films since 1999. His father, Uwe Ochsenknecht, is also an actor. He has a younger brother, Jimi Blue Ochsenknecht, and a younger sister, Cheyenne Savanna Ochsenknecht.

Selected filmography

References

External links 

1990 births
Living people
German male film actors